Clearabee is a British on-demand waste management company. The company is headquartered in Birmingham and has 60 additional locations throughout Britain. Clearabee is accredited by the Living Wage Foundation.

History
In February 2012, Clearabee was founded with an initial investment of £500 by Rob Linton and Daniel Long. The company launched its on-demand waste management service in February 2013.  In June 2015, the company opened its 15th location in Edinburgh, the new location allowed the company to operate across mainland Britain and Northern Ireland. That same year, it was reported that the company had cleared waste from over 30,000 customers and reached £4.1m in revenue. Clearabee ranked #258 on the 2018 Inc. 5000 with €7.6M in revenue for 2016 operating from over 60 locations.

In April 2018 Clearabee was named in the Financial Times  FT1000 list of the fastest growing companies in Europe ranking at number 70 for the whole of Europe and number 17 in the UK with three year revenue growth of 1,578% and Compound Annual Growth rate of 156%.

References

Waste management companies of the United Kingdom
Companies based in Birmingham, West Midlands
British companies established in 2012